Cameron Wight (born 5 April 1985) is an Australian rules footballer who played for the Western Bulldogs in the Australian Football League.

The son of former Collingwood player Terry Wight, he was picked in the 2002 AFL Draft at pick 49 from the Calder Cannons.

At the end of the 2009 season, Wight was delisted by the Bulldogs.

In November 2010 it was announced that Wight would be playing at Greenvale in the Essendon District Football League under new senior coach Anthony Rock.

References

External links

Western Bulldogs players
1985 births
Living people
Australian rules footballers from Victoria (Australia)
Calder Cannons players
Greenvale Football Club players